Ares del Maestrat, also known as Ares del Maestre in Spanish or simply Ares, is a municipality in the province of Castelló in the Valencian Country. It is situated near the top of the Mola d'Ares mountain, at an elevation of 1,148 m.

As a result of migration to the cities in the 1960s and 1970s, Ares del Maestre is sparsely populated today, yet remains a popular tourist destination. Sites of interest include the gothic town hall, neoclassical parish church, and the remains of the Mola castle.

The Tossal d'Orenga mountain, popular among paragliders, is located within the Ares del Maestre municipal term.

Demography

References

External links 

 Ares del Maestre, historia y prehistoria
 Paco González Ramírez - País Valencià, poble a poble, comarca a comarca
 Institut Valencià d'Estadística
 Portal de la Direcció General d'Administració Local de la Generalitat

Municipalities in the Province of Castellón
Maestrazgo